Goosebumps HorrorLand is a horror novella series by R.L. Stine, a spin-off of his popular Goosebumps books. There was an almost ten-year gap between the publication of the initial installment in the Goosebumps Horrorland.

Overview 
R.L. Stine had written what was originally announced as a twelve-book series titled Goosebumps HorrorLand. The series, based loosely on One Day at HorrorLand (sixteenth in the original series) and Return to HorrorLand (thirteenth in the Goosebumps 2000 series), is the first Goosebumps series where each book is part of the same plot, and the first Goosebumps fictional crossover, with characters, villains and locations from distinct Goosebumps continuities interacting.

The first twelve books were announced with the following details:

The new series will be an immersive storytelling experience welcoming fans to HorrorLand, a vast theme park which R.L. Stine describes as “the scariest place on Earth.” In a Goosebumps first, the new series will be a serialized adventure, and the story won't end on the final page of book one, Revenge of the Living Dummy. Instead, the spine-tingling and funny bone-tickling adventures will continue on the Internet and in books #1-12, each of which can also stand alone. The first nine HorrorLand books all will feature a combination of frightful new faces as well as the vilest villains from the original Goosebumps series. Ordinary kids are being summoned to HorrorLand—but why? Readers are in for the ride of their lives as the cast of characters trapped in the theme park grows larger with each book, and their situations become more and more perilous.
Books #11-12 will take place entirely in HorrorLand. Who—or what—is behind the evil plot to assemble these kids? The answer will be revealed in the final book. Soon after the debut of books #1 and #2, Scholastic also will begin to reissue original Goosebumps books—ten bestselling titles that tie in with each new story as it unfolds in HorrorLand.
Also launching in April will be a dedicated Goosebumps HorrorLand website (www.enterhorrorland.com) that, with the publication of each book, will further the narrative and provide corresponding clues to help readers unlock the secrets to HorrorLand. In addition, the web site will offer readers original HorrorLand material not available in the books—including ten free internet-only related stories, bonus downloads, interactive games, and more.

Each book had two stories. The purpose of the first, considerably longer, story is to introduce the villain and protagonists; the second story shows what happens to the protagonists when they get to HorrorLand, and are united with the other characters. The books also include a case file that links to material on the EscapeHorrorLand.com tie-in website. The final two books in the series serve to wrap up the 'HorrorLand' plot in a single climactic storyline.

Scholastic's reprints of classic Goosebumps titles to accompany the series have all-new covers and bonus material. They are known as "collector's editions," and are marketed under the title "Classic Goosebumps." Since not all the books in Goosebumps HorrorLand are connected to classic books, some of the reissues relate to the ongoing Enter HorrorLand storyline, or are simply reissues of bestsellers. For example, Be Careful What You Wish For... is a Classic reissue because the character Clarissa was used as the basis for HorrorLand's fortune-teller dummy, Madame Doom.

Ultimately, there were some deviations from the original announcement; the tenth book did not take place exclusively in HorrorLand, and reissues of classic Goosebumps books continued on past the tenth, probably due to their sales success. Finally, shortly before the publication of the twelfth and concluding book in the series, it was revealed that a new story arc, running for seven books and bringing the total to nineteen, would begin in 2010. This was confirmed in the back of the Survival Guide, in which there was a three-chapter preview.

In May 2010, Stine revealed via a video interview that he had just agreed to write six more books in the series, bringing the total to twenty-five, and that he hadn't yet come up with any ideas for them.

Format 
Each book in the first arc is split into three sections.

Section 1: The Story 
This is the main section of the book, lasting approximately 100 pages. Since it reads identically to a classic Goosebumps book, readers will be most familiar with this section. It continues to incredibly more sections.

Section 2: Enter HorrorLand 
Technically a continuation of the first section (as well as a continuation of the previous books' "Enter HorrorLand" segments), this 30-40-page mini-story is a crossover which finds the book's characters invited to HorrorLand as Very Special Guests, meeting up with other books' protagonists and villains. Each HorrorLand segment ends with a "cliffhanger" ending, to be continued in the next book's HorrorLand segment. For example, in The Scream of the Haunted Mask, at the end, Carly Beth and Sabrina think that a werewolf is tackling them. In Dr. Maniac vs. Robby Schwartz, it is revealed that it was just Robby.

Section 3: Fear File 
Only a few pages long and not included in the page count, each book's Fear File contains fictional maps, brochures, menus, etc. pertaining to the section of the theme park featured in that book, along with a hand-drawn map of the area. Each book also includes a fictional advertisement to its featured park area on the front page of each book. Most of the advertisements feature web addresses for EnterHorrorLand.com and EscapeHorrorLand.com. Each map can be connected to form the whole park map.

The order of the maps (from the top-left corner to the bottom-right corner): Top row: 6, 12, 4, 11. Middle row: 10, 8, 1, 9. Bottom row: 2, 3, 5, 7. The Fear File features which appear in the books are merely samples of the full chapters, which are published in full in Welcome to HorrorLand: A Survival Guide. The first ten chapters were originally located at escapehorrorland.com.

Other features 
Some books feature single-chapter previews of the books on which they were based. For example, Creep from the Deep features a single-chapter preview of the original Deep Trouble.
In addition, the back of each of book in the first arc shows half of a HorrorLand map token on either edge of the book. When two corresponding books, such as #1 and #2, are placed next to each other, the two halves match up and show a complete token; in this case, it features Slappy the Dummy. Following this pattern, the second book shows half of a coin that will only be complete when placed next to the third book, and so on. Each token has a unique message, written in mirror writing, around the edge. The tokens form different messages depending on whether they are placed against the following book in the series, or their corresponding companion reissue, which also bear half-tokens; for example, placing Revenge of the Living Dummy and Creep from the Deep together gives the message "Find This Token Online," but Revenge of the Living Dummy and the reissued Night of the Living Dummy spell "Find This Dummy Online." The twelfth, final token was never completed.

Second Arc 
The books in the second arc, from #13 onwards, are also split into three parts - Part One is a mini-adventure in HorrorLand, Part Two tells the main story, and the Epilogue describes the hero's return to HorrorLand.

Online bookstores have posted a listing for more then-upcoming Goosebumps HorrorLand books, beginning with "When The Ghost Dog Howls", released on January 1, 2010. They have provided the following synopsis, implying that the series has been extended to include nineteen books with a new seven-book story arc:

Each eerie adventure of the next seven-book arc begins with a trip to the Chiller House, a gift shop only found in HorrorLand. Kids are invited to take a little horror home with them and given a souvenir and a miniature Horror. At home, the kids experience wild things with their "free" gift, while the glowing, menacing Horror keeps an eye on the fun. When it's time for their payment, the Horror takes them back to shopkeeper Jonathan Chiller.
Unlucky book #13 kicks off an entirely new type of terror that will keep you guessing and quaking until book #19.

Third Arc 
Announced in May 2010, the third arc, known as "Hall of Horrors", contains six books. The arc's tagline is "The Hall of Horrors is open. Step into the nightmare!". According to the teaser at the end of book 19, the Hall of Horrors is "hidden in the darkest shadows of the park. It is the place for kids who have frightening stories to tell." Hall of Horrors is numbered as a separate series, beginning again at #1. The Hall of Horrors is run by a Horror called the Story-Keeper, who hears the stories of the protagonist when they visit the Hall of Horrors.

Books

Characters 

The main protagonists in the HorrorLand series.

List indicator(s)
 (Own Book) indicates the character appeared in their own book with their own experience.
 (HorrorLand) indicates the character was invited or has been to the HorrorLand amusement park.
 (Chiller House) indicates the character was invited to the Chiller House in the HorrorLand amusement park.
 (Hall of Horrors) indicates the character has visited the Hall of Horrors in the HorrorLand amusement park.
 (s) indicates that a different main character was in the same book.
 (A Grey Cell) indicates the character did not appear in their own book, has visited HorrorLand, or was invited to the Chiller House.
 (a) indicates that all the characters above a are in this book.
 (b) indicates that all the characters between a and b are in this book.

Companion websites 

The series is complemented by companion websites.

Enter HorrorLand 
The website EnterHorrorLand.com is a "gameplay experience which immerses fans in HorrorLand itself". It is based around twelve map sections corresponding to each HorrorLand book, each of which includes numerous mini-games. The premise of each map section is that the antagonist of the corresponding book is trying to take over that area of HorrorLand; the minigames tell the story of each antagonist's defeat by the player. Strangely, the player is frequently represented by Mr. Wood, the main antagonist from Night of the Living Dummy. Guidance and help are provided by the automated fortune teller named Madame Doom. The front page features two short animated movies, "What to Expect in HorrorLand" and "An Interview with Slappy", with a blank option suggesting a third to come. The site opened on February 20, 2008. The site was redirected to Scholastic.com/Goosebumps/HorrorLand in November 2009.

Escape HorrorLand 
The website EscapeHorrorLand.com was a "serialized, story-driven, fact-finding experience" hosted by the protagonists of One Day at HorrorLand. It was ostensibly a blog that sought out, posted evidence and information about the HorrorLand theme park, 
and was written by Luke Morris of One Day at HorrorLand. His sister Lizzy also contributed to the site, largely in the form of extracts from a "Welcome to HorrorLand" guidebook (ultimately printed separately as Welcome to HorrorLand: A Survival Guide). Luke's friend Clay was also mentioned. Luke and Lizzy received HorrorLand correspondence from Madame Doom, the mysterious "MONSTER-X", who tells the Morrises that HorrorLand has changed, and Slappy the Dummy. Several of the correspondence props appear within the HorrorLand books themselves. The site opened on February 14, 2008, and ceased updating its blog on August 22, 2008; the HorrorLand survival guide had only ten of its twelve chapters posted. The site was closed and redirected to Scholastic.com/Goosebumps/HorrorLand in November 2009.

Video game 
Scholastic Book Company released a Goosebumps HorrorLand video game on October 28, 2008, to tie into the series, on the Nintendo DS, Wii, and PlayStation 2 platforms. Developed by Gusto Games in Derby, the plot follows a young child and his/her friends trapped in HorrorLand, where they must make their way through challenging levels to escape the evil theme park. Reports indicate the game is similar to the original Goosebumps HorrorLand game Goosebumps: Escape from HorrorLand, in which players had to beat the minigames of various levels to reveal who was behind events in the park and get back home. The official website reveals that HorrorLand in the game would have five main areas: Vampire Village (which serves as a hub connecting all the others), Mad Labs, Terror Tombs (an Egyptian-themed area), Fever Swamp, and the Carnival of Screams. Several of these areas are references to classic Goosebumps books or previous depictions of HorrorLand.

References

External links 
 Scholastic's HorrorLand webpage
 EscapeHorrorLand.com
 Official Goosebumps Web Page
 Official Goosebumps HorrorLand Video Game Web Page 
 R.L. Stine's Official Website
 R.L. Stine's Twitter

Book series introduced in 2008
Goosebumps